Chloroclystis tridentata is a moth in the family Geometridae. It was described by David Stephen Fletcher in 1958 and it is endemic to Uganda.

References

External links

Moths described in 1958
tridentata
Endemic fauna of Uganda
Lepidoptera of Uganda